was a Japanese politician and former member of the House of Councillors.  Hayashida served as the governor of Kyoto from April 16, 1978 until April 15, 1986. He later became the Minister of Justice from November 6, 1987 to  December 27, 1988.

Hayashida was born in Maizuru, Kyoto and died of heart failure at the age of 91 in Tokyo.

References

External links 
 Yukio Hayashida obituary 
 New York Times: In Japan, Visitors Will Be a Little Less Alien

1915 births
2007 deaths
Government ministers of Japan
Governors of Kyoto
Members of the House of Councillors (Japan)
University of Tokyo alumni